The Ira A. Fulton College of Engineering represents Brigham Young University's (BYU) engineering discipline and includes the following engineering departments: chemical, civil, electrical and computer, mechanical, and the school of technology. The College awards about 700 degrees every year (600 BS, 90 MS, 18 PhD) and has almost 3,600 students.

History

The College had roots going back to the introduction of Brigham Young Academy, but the College's more official beginning occurred when the first dean, Harvey Fletcher, organized the engineering program at BYU in 1952.  This was the department of Engineering Science that at the time was part of the BYU College of Arts and Sciences.  By 1965, there were four engineering departments (Chemical, Physical, Civil and Electrical), with enrollment at the median compared to engineering schools in the United States. By 1969, enrollment had reached the 70th percentile. The college has continued to expand, and now includes 5 main facilities for its students: the Engineering Building, Engineering Research Lab, and the Clyde, Crabtree, and Snell buildings. Fletcher's design of the acoustics for the DeJong Concert Hall of the College of Fine Arts at BYU is at times attributed to this college since Fletcher was the first head of the engineering department. However, since acoustics is a sub-field of physics it is also possible to attribute that work more to the College of Physical and Engineering Sciences, which is where both physics and engineering were housed at that time. That college is a partial ancestor of the College of Engineering but also of the BYU College of Physical and Mathematical Sciences.

The Ira A. Fulton College of Engineering was formed in 1972 by the merging of the four engineering departments from the College of Physical and Engineering Sciences, which was then renamed the college of Physical and Mathematical Sciences with most of the College of Industrial and Technical Education.  

The College of Industrial and Technical Education had been formed in 1965 when it was split from the General College, which was separated from the College of Biological and Agricultural Sciences in 1957. The placement of Technical and Industrial Education in a college labeled Biological and Agricultural Sciences had arguably never been entirely logical. It did make a little sense considering one possible program was vocational agriculture, but the general disconnect between the terminology and the actual programs probably explains why the Industrial and Technical Education programs had only been in the College of Biology and Agriculture for 3 years. Prior to 1954 what would become the college of Biology and Agriculture had along with what would become the College of Family Living, which in turn was a predecessor of the College of Family, Home and Social Sciences been the college of Applied Science.  Under this name the inclusion of technical education programs had made sense.

The specific origins of the College of Engineering Sciences was the Mechanical Arts department. This was organized as a separate department in 1921, although the first teacher at BYU to give classes in subjects related to this department had been Karl G. Maeser (in many ways the intellectual father of BYU). In 1951 the department was renamed from Mechanical Arts to Industrial Arts. In 1952 it was renamed to Industrial Arts and Drawing. It was in 1955 that the department was divided into the Industrial Education Department with the focus on training teachers to either teach at technical and industrial schools or to teach vocational education, popularly known as "shop", classes in high schools or junior high school on the one hand, and the Technical and Professional Institute which in many ways functioned as a two-year technical college within the four-year university. This Technical and Professional institute offered classes in various fields such as printing and physical plant administration that would prepare students for jobs in these fields.  The institute also included such programs as the associate degree in nursing program which was at this point kept separate from the College of Nursing because the ability of the College of Nursing to receive full accreditation would have been undermined if it had included an associate degree program.

In 1972 when the new College of Engineering and Technology was formed, some programs that had been in the old College of Industrial and Technical Education were not included in the new college. Among these was the associate degree in nursing program which was moved to the College of Nursing, both due to a decision to make it easier to move from the associates to bachelors in nursing programs and in part because of changing attitudes by the accrediting bodies on nursing education that made it possible to now offer both associates and bachelors level nursing programs under the same general heading. The College also supervises the BYU Center for Animation.

In 2016, ground was broken for a new building for the College of Engineering Sciences and alumnus King Husein served as the Volunteer Fundraising Committee chair for the new $80 million building. In September of 2018, the Ira A. Fulton College of Engineering & Technology shortened its name to the Ira A. Fulton College of Engineering.

Current status and research
The college currently includes many different research areas. The college was renamed in 2003 to honor Ira A. Fulton, an Arizona businessman, who donated money to the College. Arizona State University's Ira A. Fulton School of Engineering is also named for Fulton.
With those donations, the College was able to purchase a supercomputer that is used for research by the College and the BYU campus community.

Some of the many research projects the College is involved with include the MAGICC lab and the Electric Vehicle Racing team. The MAGICC Lab is involved with designing automated devices such as robots and unmanned air vehicles. The team has worked in conjunction with military contractors, and the team has continually placed at competitions involving UAVs. The Electric Vehicle Racing team has worked in conjunction with National Instruments, and has designed high power electric racing vehicles used for competitions.

The college received rankings in U.S. News & World Reports 2005 report placing it at 81st in the nation. Specifically, Mechanical Engineering was ranked 53rd, and Electrical and Computer Engineering was ranked 68th in their respective graduate programs .  The programs offered by the college are accredited by ABET and other organizations .

Degrees offered
Department of Chemical Engineering
BS — Chemical Engineering
MS — Chemical Engineering
PhD — Chemical Engineering

Department of Civil & Construction Engineering
BS — Civil Engineering
BS — Construction Management
BS — Facilities Management
MS — Civil Engineering
PhD — Civil Engineering

Department of Electrical & Computer Engineering
BS — Computer Engineering
BS — Electrical Engineering
MS — Electrical and Computer Engineering
PhD — Electrical and Computer Engineering

Department of Mechanical Engineering
BS — Mechanical Engineering
MS — Mechanical Engineering
PhD — Mechanical Engineering

Department of Manufacturing Engineering
BS — Manufacturing Engineering
MS — Manufacturing Engineering
PhD — Manufacturing Engineering

School of Technology
BS — Information Technology & Cybersecurity
BS — Technology and Engineering Studies
BFA — Industrial Design

Sources

Ernest L. Wilkinson, ed., Brigham Young University:The First 100 Years (Provo: BYU Press, 1975) Vol. 2, p. 782-786.

External links
 Official Website

Brigham Young University
Educational institutions established in 1953
Educational institutions established in 1972
Engineering schools and colleges in the United States
Engineering universities and colleges in Utah
University subdivisions in Utah
1953 establishments in Utah